The speckled nightingale-thrush or Sclater's nightingale-thrush (Catharus maculatus) is a species of bird in the thrush family Turdidae native to South America.

Taxonomy
The speckled nightingale-thrush was first described in 1858 by Philip Sclater as Malacocichla maculatus. In 1879 it was subsumed as a subspecies of the spotted nightingale-thrush, as Cantharus dryas maculatus. In 2017, it was argued based on phylogenetic analysis of mitochondrial DNA, morphometric and vocal data analyses, and modeling of ecological niches, that it should again be considered a separate species. The former "spotted nightingale-thrush" (Catharus dryas sensu lato) was split into the speckled nightingale-thrush (C. maculatus) and the yellow-throated nightingale-thrush (C. dryas sensu stricto).

References

Catharus
Birds described in 1858
Taxa named by Philip Sclater